The HP Garage is a private museum where the company Hewlett-Packard (HP) was founded. It is located at 367 Addison Avenue in Palo Alto, California. It is considered to be the "Birthplace of Silicon Valley". In the 1930s, Stanford University and its Dean of Engineering Frederick Terman began encouraging faculty and graduates to stay in the area instead of leaving California, and develop a high-tech region. HP founders Bill Hewlett and David Packard are considered the first Stanford students who took Terman's advice. 

The garage has since been designated a California Historical Landmark and is listed on the National Register of Historic Places. Though not open for public tours, the property can be viewed from the sidewalk and driveway.

History
The home, originally designated as 367 Addison Avenue, was first occupied in 1905 by Dr. John Spencer, his wife Ione, and their two adult daughters. Dr. Spencer became Palo Alto's first mayor in 1909. In 1918, the house was divided into two separate apartments, numbered 367 and 369.

In 1937, David "Dave" Packard, then 25 years old, visited William "Bill" Hewlett in Palo Alto and the pair had their first business meeting. Both men attended Stanford University, where its Dean of Engineering Frederick Terman encouraged his students to establish their own electronics companies in the area instead of leaving California.

In 1938, newly married Dave and Lucile Packard moved into 367 Addison Ave, the first-floor three-room apartment, with Bill Hewlett sleeping in the shed. Mrs. Spencer, now widowed, moved into the second-floor apartment, 369 Addison. Hewlett and Packard began to use the one-car garage, with $538 in capital.

In 1939, Packard and Hewlett formed their partnership with a coin toss, creating the name Hewlett-Packard.

Hewlett-Packard's first product, built in the garage, was an audio oscillator, the HP200A. One of Hewlett-Packard's first customers was Walt Disney Studios, which purchased eight oscillators to test and certify the sound systems in theaters that were going to run the first major film released in stereophonic sound, Fantasia.

Historical designations
 California registered landmark, 1987
 National Register of Historic Places, 2007

References

External links

 Rebuilding HP's Garage

Hewlett-Packard
History of Silicon Valley
Buildings and structures in Palo Alto, California
Tourist attractions in Santa Clara County, California
Houses in Santa Clara County, California
National Register of Historic Places in Santa Clara County, California
Buildings and structures on the National Register of Historic Places in California